Charles Kaufman (1920–2004) was an American judge for the Third Circuit Court of Michigan, with jurisdiction over south-east Michigan and its largest city, Detroit.

Biography
Born in 1920, Kaufman served as a navigator for the Army Air Force during World War II. He became a POW (prisoner of war) in Japanese prison camp when his plane was shot down after 27 missions.

After the war, Kaufman graduated from Wayne State University Law School in 1948, and joined his father's firm before winning the election for Common Pleas Court Judge in 1959, and Wayne County Third Circuit Court of Michigan in 1964 where he served for 30 years. He also was a candidate for the First District of the Michigan Court of Appeals in 1968 and 1982, and a Michigan State Supreme Court candidate in 1976.

Vincent Chin ruling
Kaufman is the judge who sentenced former Chrysler plant superintendent Ronald Ebens and his stepson Michael Nitz on March 16, 1983 to three years' probation and $3,780 in fines and court costs after they were convicted of manslaughter for the killing of Vincent Chin. Asian-American advocacy groups were outraged. Ebens had gone with Nitz to hunt down Chin and the only other Asian in his group of four friends and had Nitz hold Chin down as Ebens used a baseball bat to viciously beat Chin in the head. The act was a hate crime as witnesses heard him say, "It's because of you little motherfuckers that we're out of work," referring to the Japanese auto industry, particularly Chrysler's increased sales of captively-imported Mitsubishi models rebadged and sold under the Dodge and now-defunct Plymouth brands, and Nitz's layoff from Chrysler in 1979, despite the fact that Chin was of Chinese descent, not Japanese.

Citing the judge's POW record in a Japanese prison camp as one of several reasons to invalidate the sentence in favor of a more stringent punishment, advocacy groups unsuccessfully tried to vacate the original sentence. Kaufman cited the defendants' clean prior criminal records and that there was no minimum sentence for a manslaughter plea as he responded, "These weren't the kind of men you send to jail... You don't make the punishment fit the crime; you make the punishment fit the criminal." Kaufman's sentence was upheld as valid and final, due to the Fifth Amendment protection against double jeopardy, and the advocacy groups shifted their efforts toward a Federal prosecution for the violation of Vincent Chin's civil rights. This would also prove ultimately unsuccessful after an appeal and retrial of Ebens' original 1984 Federal conviction resulted in acquittal.

Kaufman later retired from the Third Circuit Court, and died in 2004.

References

External links
Michigan Jewish History

1920 births
2004 deaths
Michigan state court judges
Wayne State University alumni
United States Army Air Forces personnel of World War II
World War II prisoners of war held by Japan
20th-century American judges
United States Army Air Forces officers
American prisoners of war in World War II
Shot-down aviators